The 2021 Butler Bulldogs football team represented Butler University in the 2021 NCAA Division I FCS football season as a member of the Pioneer Football League. They were led by 16th-year head coach Jeff Voris and played their home games at Bud and Jackie Sellick Bowl.

Schedule

References

Butler
Butler Bulldogs football seasons
Butler Bulldogs football